Keith Lucas may refer to:

Keith Lucas (neuroscientist) (1879–1916), British scientist
Keith Lucas (comedian) (born 1985), British comedian, one half of The Lucas Brothers
Keith Lucas (racing driver), racing driver in the 1953 NASCAR Grand National Series

See also
Keith-Lucas (surname), surname used by the three sons of scientist Keith Lucas